KCMD (99.3 FM) is a radio station based in Grants Pass, Oregon and is owned by Bicoastal Media Licenses VI, LLC. KCMD currently airs a news/talk format, simulcasting KMED 106.3 FM Eagle Point. KCMD was acquired from Three Rivers Broadcasting, LLC on March 31, 2017 for $325,000.

External links
Official website

CMD
Grants Pass, Oregon
Radio stations established in 2012
2012 establishments in Oregon
News and talk radio stations in the United States